Tetley Gant, CMG (9 July 1853 – 7 February 1928) was an Australian barrister, Tasmanian politician and chancellor.

Early life – England
Tetley was born in Manningham, Yorkshire, England, the son of James Greaves Tetley Gant, (1815–1873), Bradford solicitor, and Sarah Ann Gaunt. He attended Rugby School and St John's College, in  Oxford.

Career – Australia
In 1884 Gant migrated to Australia and settled in Hobart. His legal qualifications allowed him to enter the Supreme Court of Tasmania and in 1888 Gant started a legal partnership with Sir Neil Elliott Lewis.

Gant was elected to the seat of Buckingham in the Tasmanian Legislative Council in May 1901, retaining it until August 1927. Gant was appointed to the council for the University of Tasmania in 1905 and in 1909 he succeeded Sir Neil Elliott Lewis as Vice-Chancellor. In 1914 he was appointed Chancellor,  succeeding Sir John Stokell Dodds.

In 1902 Gant became president of the Amateur Horticultural Society of Hobart. In 1910 he was elected the founding President of the Buckingham Rowing and Swimming Club and in 1913 he was appointed president of the Tasmanian Club.

Personal life
Tetley married Frances Amy Roope, daughter of Lavington Roope, on 19 July 1882 at St John's Church, New Town, Tasmania

Gant died on 7 February 1928 at Lower Sandy Bay, Tasmania.

His wife Frances was also very active and started the Queen Mary Club, a social club for ladies in Hobart, on 4 July 1910.

References

External links

1853 births
1928 deaths
Politicians from Hobart
Members of the Tasmanian Legislative Council
Presidents of the Tasmanian Legislative Council
Companions of the Order of St Michael and St George
Alumni of St John's College, Oxford
20th-century Australian politicians